Tyr is a fictional character, an Asgardian god appearing in American comic books published by Marvel Comics. The character is based on the Norse god of the same name. Along with Thor and Balder, he is one of Odin's biological sons.

The character was portrayed by Clive Russell in a cameo in the Marvel Cinematic Universe film Thor: The Dark World.

Publication history

Tyr first appeared in Journey into Mystery #85 (Oct 1962), and was created by Stan Lee, Larry Lieber and Jack Kirby.

Fictional character biography
Tyr is the Asgardian god of war. Tyr was renowned throughout Asgard as being the only god brave enough to place his hand in the mouth of the wolf-god Fenris during the latter's binding which Fenris would not allow unless a god placed his hand in his mouth; his left hand is missing as a result, having been bitten off by Fenris, and is now usually covered by a metal cup. He has fought in the defense of Asgard numerous times. He has several times rebelled against Odin due to his love of battle, and fought Thor due to resentment of Thor's relationship with Sif, and the fact Thor usurped his role as Asgard's greatest warrior. Once he was nearly exiled for this, but Thor pleaded for mercy.

At a time before the loss of his hand Tyr is one of the executioners chosen to slay Balder for the crime of ignoring his comrades on the battlefield. Tyr fires an arrow, which is snatched away by an eagle.

Tyr battled with Asgardian forces against a false Ragnarok which Odin had engineered to delay the real Ragnarok. He later lost a friendly wager to Thor over whether his strength had declined after battling the Celestials. Tyr later allied with Loki against Odin, and captured the goddess Idunn and her Golden Apples of Immortality, without which the gods would grow old and perish. He unleashed the Midgard Serpent on Earth when it had been strengthened by the Apples, and it is used as a bridge by their army to attack Asgard. With the enemies of Asgard, he followed Odin and the other gods to Earth, where he was betrayed by Loki and defeated by Odin. Alongside Beta Ray Bill, the Avengers, the Fantastic Four, and the Asgardian forces, Tyr battled Surtur's demons on Earth. Tyr then returned to Asgard. Later, in a battle, Thor references Tyr's ancient homeland and wise 'Hymir', who is often thought of as Tyr's father. Tyr answers the call to the defense of Asgard when it is threatened by the Egyptian death-god Seth.

Tyr is part of a small group of Asgardian warriors who petition Odin for the lives of the Warriors Three and their guardsman ally. Odin, influenced by an outside force, angrily dismisses Tyr's groups and declares the Warriors and the guardsman will die for being traitors to Asgard.

During the events of Ragnarok, Tyr fought alongside Beta Ray Bill and the armies of Asgard against Surtur, the Fire Demons, trolls and giants, and perished during battle.

Asgard's return involves a brief stay in the country of Latveria, where its ruler, Doctor Doom murders several Asgardians. Tyr is part of the force leading an attack on Doom's fortress.

During the Siege of Asgard, Tyr was present with the Asgardians when news of Volstagg turning himself over to the Broxton authorities reaches Asgard. He assumes command of the Asgardian forces when Balder takes leave. Tyr suffers a personal crisis when it is predicted he will fall in battle. After he sees those who have he rallies himself to return to the front lines where he is seriously wounded by The Hood's Norn stones. Tyr takes control of the spirits of the fallen Asgardians and they pray for someone to lead them to the afterlife. This prayer is answered in the form of Danielle Moonstar, who has regained her old role as a Valkyrie. On her heels come 'Disir', predatory Valkryies from ancient times, who try to feast on the souls of the fallen. Danielle and Tyr fight off the creatures but lose three Asgardians to oblivion. Tyr reassures Danielle she fought well regardless. The "survivors" are led to an afterlife while Tyr stands behind. Danielle tells him he is not really dead, but close to it.

Tyr is later seen, alive and well, investigating the theft of the Golden Apples of Idunn. Said apples help support the long lives and vitality of his fellow gods. Tyr is tricked into thinking the perpetrator is the heroic Amadeus Cho. The real perpetrator is Agamemnon, a former Asgardian that has gone mad with power and the sheer number of years he has lived. When an invading army from beyond the universe threatens all the nine realms, Tyr and Balder volunteer to strike directly at the enemy. They suffer in their battle but the army is soon forced back with the assistance of Odin.

Tyr becomes the commander of Hela's underworld forces. The two share an attraction they try to deny.

When Angela leads a rebellion against Hela, Tyr leads Skurge and Balder to oppose her. During the fight he admits he loves only Hela.

Tyr later assists a group of Asgardians, some dead, some alive, in fighting an invasion of Hel itself. He ends up drawn into the realm of Valhalla, not as a feasting warrior, but as a kitchen worker.

Powers and abilities
Tyr is a member of the race of superhumans known as Asgardians, and therefore has superhuman strength, speed, stamina, durability, agility, and reflexes, and has an extremely long life span and immunity to all Earthly diseases as well as some resistance to magic. Tyr, being the God of War, is not only highly skilled at hand-to-hand combat, but also proficient with all forms of Asgardian weaponry as well. Even after the destruction of Asgard, Tyr has revealed a special ability, a hidden power enabling him to summon forth the "Soul of the God of War", releasing destructive energies through his severed hand.

He usually carries a sword and shield. Tyr once stole the Mace of the Myth-Wars, a weapon once wielded by Odin and possessing powers similar to Thor's hammer Mjolnir, as well as the ability to teleport between adjacent universes, such as Midgard and Asgard. Tyr believed that the enchanted mace was "equal to the challenge of mystic Mjolnir" and has shown itself capable of knocking back even Thor. During the combat, the Mace is destroyed by Thor using his lightning.

In other media

Film
 Clive Russell portrays Tyr in the live-action film Thor: The Dark World. This version is the commander of the Einherjar guards, and is seen working closely with Odin.

Video games
 Tyr appears as an NPC in the video game Marvel: Ultimate Alliance, voiced by Trev Broudy.

References

External links
The Official Site for Thor Comics

Tyr at MarvelDirectory.com

Characters created by Jack Kirby
Characters created by Larry Lieber
Characters created by Stan Lee
Comics characters introduced in 1962
Fictional amputees
Fictional characters with superhuman durability or invulnerability
Fictional gods
Marvel Comics Asgardians
Marvel Comics characters who can move at superhuman speeds
Marvel Comics characters with accelerated healing
Marvel Comics characters with superhuman strength